3rd Cavalry Brigade of the Imperial Japanese Army was formed on April 1, 1909.

Organization 
The 3rd Cavalry brigade comprises
 23rd Cavalry regiment
 24th Cavalry regiment
 3rd Horse artillery regiment
 Brigade machine-gun unit
 Brigade anti-tank unit
 Brigade tank unit
 Brigade transport unit

Japanese World War II brigades
Military units and formations established in 1909
Military units and formations disestablished in 1945